Japanese football in 1992

Japan Football League

First Division

Second Division
Seino Unyu and Osaka Gas had been promoted automatically after winning the Regional Playoffs.

Japanese Regional Leagues

Emperor's Cup

J.League Cup

National team

Results

Players statistics

External links

 
Seasons in Japanese football